Plasnewydd (meaning New Manor or New Place in English) is an electoral ward (and formerly the name of a community) of Cardiff, Wales. It falls within the parliamentary constituency of Cardiff Central.  It is bounded by the electoral wards of Cyncoed (Roath Park) to the north; Penylan to the northeast; Adamsdown (main Newport Road) to the southwest; and Cathays (Cardiff to Caerphilly railway) to the west. It covers what is now the community of Roath.

The ward population taken at the 2011 census was 18,166.

History
Plasnewydd takes its name from a 17th century house called "The New Place", originally a home of Edwards Richard and, in 1890, given to the local people. It later became the Mackintosh Community Centre. Roath and Plasnewydd were absorbed into Cardiff in 1875. The main road through the village, Castle Road, was renamed City Road in 1905 to mark Cardiff's new city status.

Plasnewydd was previously the name of the Roath community until the Boundary Commission renamed it in the 2010s.

Electoral ward

Plasnewydd ward elects four councillors to sit on Cardiff Council. In 2010 a Boundary Commission report was published recommending a number of boundary changes and ward renaming in Cardiff. Amongst them was a proposal to change the name of Plasnewydd electoral division to "Roath". Ultimately the changes were not taken forward.

Local elections

2022

* = sitting councillor prior to the election

2017

* = sitting councillor prior to the election

2016 by-election
Following the death of Labour councillor, Mohammed Javed, early in 2016, a by-election was held for the vacant seat. It was won by the Liberal Democrats with a 15% increase on their 2012 vote.

2012
The Council's Liberal Democrat leader Rodney Berman had previously represented the Plasnewydd ward until he was defeated, following two recounts, in the May 2012 Council elections. Following the election, all four seats were represented by the Labour Party.

Cardiff City Council 1973-1996
Plasnewydd was a ward for Cardiff City Council between 1973 and 1996, electing three Conservative councillors at the 1973, 1976 and 1979 elections. In 1983 the size of the ward increased and representation increased to 4 councillors, with the Conservatives losing their control of the ward over the next two elections. Four Labour councillors were elected at the May 1991 elections.

References

External links
 Plasnewydd Ward Information

Roath